Piggott is a city in Clay County, Arkansas, United States. It is one of the two county seats of Clay County, along with Corning. It is the northern terminus of the Arkansas segment of the Crowley's Ridge Parkway, a National Scenic Byway. As of the 2010 census, Piggott's population was 3,849. The town was named after James A. Piggott, one of the early settlers and initiator of the local post office.

Geography
Piggott is located in eastern Clay County on the eastern edge of Crowley's Ridge. U.S. Route 62 passes through the city, running west  to Corning and northeast  to Interstate 55 at New Madrid, Missouri.

The topography of Piggott is mostly flat in the eastern half of the city with the more developed western half lying along Crowley’s Ridge, creating a sensation of coming down from a small mount to the flatland below. This ridge is a naturally occurring phenomenon created over millennia by wind-blown periglacial loess and possibly by seismic activity in the region.

Demographics

2020 census

As of the 2020 United States census, there were 3,622 people, 1,589 households, and 955 families residing in the city.

2000 census
As of the census of 2000, there were 3,894 people, 1,726 households, and 1,101 families residing in the city. The racial makeup of the city was 98.59% White, 0.23% Black or African American, 0.18% Native American, 0.18% from other races, and 0.82% from two or more races.  0.77% of the population were Hispanic or Latino of any race.

There were 1,726 households, out of which 27.0% had children under the age of 18 living with them, 52.0% were married couples living together, 9.4% had a female householder with no husband present, and 36.2% were non-families. 33.0% of all households were made up of individuals, and 20.6% had someone living alone who was 65 years of age or older.  The average household size was 2.20 and the average family size was 2.79.

In the city, the population was spread out, with 22.1% under the age of 18, 7.4% from 18 to 24, 23.9% from 25 to 44, 23.3% from 45 to 64, and 23.2% who were 65 years of age or older.  The median age was 42 years. For every 100 females, there were 87.3 males.  For every 100 females age 18 and over, there were 79.6 males.

The median income for a household in the city was $25,404, and the median income for a family was $35,625. Males had a median income of $25,482 versus $19,405 for females. The per capita income for the city was $16,382.  About 8.1% of families and 9.9% of the population were below the poverty line, including 15.2% of those under age 18 and 15.9% of those age 65 or over.

Government

Local civic leaders
Mayor: Bradley Scheffler
City Clerk: Nikki Blue
City Treasurer: Jamie Cluck
District Judge: Dan Stidham
City Attorney: Kimberly B. Dale 
Police Chief: Jeremy Wicker
Fire Chief: Jeff Benbrook
Utility Administrator: Brian Haley
Street Superintendent: Gary Chronister
Water Superintendent: Zach Baker
Electric Superintendent: Justin Welch

Voting districts
State Senate District: 20
State House District: 56
U.S. Congressional District: 1

Education
The Piggott School District is composed of two campuses. Piggott Elementary School is the campus for grades K-6, while Piggott High School is composed of grades 7-12. In recent years, the school has enrolled around 1,000 students per school year. The schools offer several extracurricular activities for students including athletics, band, and various clubs and organizations. The athletic program includes boys' football, tennis, basketball, baseball, golf, and track and field. Girls' sports include basketball, volleyball, tennis, softball, track and field, and golf. Most recently, the school added a skeet shooting team to its list of activities. PHS also opened a new gymnasium during the 2007-2008 athletic season.

Cultural references
Piggott is perhaps best known for its association with American writer and Nobel laureate Ernest Hemingway, whose second wife Pauline Pfeiffer was the daughter of prominent local landowner and businessman Paul Pfeiffer. After meeting and marrying in Paris in the late 1920s, Hemingway and Pauline made frequent and lengthy visits to her parents' home in Piggott, where Ernest Hemingway wrote portions of A Farewell to Arms, and other works.  The Pfeiffer House and Carriage House are now preserved as the Hemingway-Pfeiffer Museum and Educational Center, run by Arkansas State University.

The Piggott Post Office is the home of an oil-on-canvas mural "Air Mail" painted in 1941 by Dan Rhodes and funded by the Treasury Section of Fine Arts, a New Deal public art program.  The mural was featured on a sheet of U.S. postage stamps, "Post Office Murals," issued on April 10, 2019.

The town was mentioned in the 1990s television sitcom Evening Shade, set in Arkansas. The high school football team coached by "Wood Newton" (played by Burt Reynolds) celebrated when it tied Piggott High in a game, which it almost always lost.

Piggott was also one of the filming sites for Andy Griffith's acting debut, A Face in the Crowd. The film, which also starred Patricia Neal, featured several Piggott citizens as extras. Scenes were also filmed in the northeast Arkansas town of Paragould. Several locations in Piggott are featured in the movie, including the Piggott Mohawk football field, the old Clay County jail, and a swimming pool at the Matilda and Karl Pfeiffer residence. Piggott was chosen when Toby Bruce, a friend of Ernest Hemingway, recommended the site to writer Budd Schulberg.

Notable people
Frances Greer, opera singer
Pauline Pfeiffer, second wife of Ernest Hemingway

References

External links

City of Piggott official website
Crowley's Ridge Parkway - Arkansas
Hemingway-Pfeiffer Museum and Educational Center
Encyclopedia of Arkansas History & Culture entry

Cities in Clay County, Arkansas
Cities in Arkansas
County seats in Arkansas